Sursur Rural District is a rural district (dehestan) in Muchesh District, Kamyaran County, Kurdistan Province, Iran. At the 2006 census, its population was 5,674, in 1,370 families. The rural district has 31 villages.

References 

Rural Districts of Kurdistan Province
Kamyaran County